Horse Canyon is a small canyon near the towns of Boulder and Escalante in the Grand Staircase–Escalante National Monument in central Garfield County, Utah, United States

Description
The canyon is one of the three canyons which meet at a fork and turn into Horse Canyon, which is followed down to the Escalante River.

See also

 List of canyons and gorges in Utah

References

External links
 

Canyons and gorges of Utah
Canyons and gorges of Garfield County, Utah
Grand Staircase–Escalante National Monument